April Catherine Glaspie (born April 26, 1942) is an American former diplomat and senior member of the Foreign Service, best known for her role in the events leading up to the Gulf War.

Early life

Glaspie was born in Vancouver, British Columbia, and graduated from Mills College in Oakland, California, in 1963, and from Johns Hopkins University's Paul H. Nitze School of Advanced International Studies in 1965.

In 1966 Glaspie entered the United States foreign service, where she became an expert on the Middle East. After postings in Kuwait, Syria, and Egypt, Glaspie was appointed ambassador to Iraq in 1988. She was the first woman to be appointed an American ambassador to an Arab country. She had a reputation as a respected Arabist, and her instructions were to broaden cultural and commercial contacts with the Iraqi regime.

Subsequently, Glaspie was posted to the U.S. Mission to the United Nations in New York City. She was later posted to South Africa as Consul general in Cape Town. She held this post until her retirement in 2002.

Career

United States Ambassador to Iraq

Meetings with Saddam Hussein

Glaspie's appointment as U.S. ambassador to Iraq followed a period from 1980 to 1989 during which the United States had given covert support to Iraq during its war with Iran.

Glaspie had her first meeting with Iraqi President Saddam Hussein and his Deputy Prime Minister, Tariq Aziz, on July 25, 1990. In her telegram from July 25, 1990, to the Department of State, Glaspie summarized the meeting as follows:  
Saddam told the ambassador on July 25 that Mubarak has arranged for Kuwaiti and Iraqi delegations to meet in Riyadh, and then on July 28, 29 or 30, the Kuwaiti crown prince will come to Baghdad for serious negotiations. "Nothing serious will happen" before then, Saddam had promised Mubarak.

At least two transcripts of the meeting have been published. The State Department has not confirmed the accuracy of these transcripts, but Glaspie's cable has been released at the Bush Library and placed online by the Margaret Thatcher Foundation.

One version of the transcript has Glaspie saying: 

Later the transcript has Glaspie saying: 

Another version of the transcript (the one published in The New York Times on 23 September 1990) has Glaspie saying: 

When these purported transcripts were made public, Glaspie was accused of having given tacit approval for the Iraqi invasion of Kuwait, which took place on August 2, 1990. It was argued that Glaspie's statements that "We have no opinion on your Arab-Arab conflicts" and that "the Kuwait issue is not associated with America" were interpreted by Saddam as giving free rein to handle his disputes with Kuwait as he saw fit. It was also argued that Saddam would not have invaded Kuwait had he been given an explicit warning that such an invasion would be met with force by the United States. Journalist Edward Mortimer wrote in the New York Review of Books in November 1990: 

In September 1990, a pair of British journalists confronted Glaspie with the transcript of her meeting with Saddam Hussein, to which she replied that "Obviously, I didn't think, and nobody else did, that the Iraqis were going to take all of Kuwait."

In April 1991 Glaspie testified before the Senate Foreign Relations Committee. She said that at the July 25 meeting she had "repeatedly warned Iraqi President Saddam Hussein against using force to settle his dispute with Kuwait." She also said that Saddam had lied to her by denying he would invade Kuwait. Asked to explain how Saddam could have interpreted her comments as implying U.S. approval for the invasion of Kuwait, she replied: "We foolishly did not realize he [Saddam] was stupid." In July 1991 State Department spokesperson Richard Boucher said at a press briefing:

The cables that Glaspie sent from Iraq about her meeting with Saddam are no longer classified. Glaspie's cable on her meeting with Saddam reports that President George H. W. Bush "had instructed her to broaden and deepen our relations with Iraq." Saddam, in turn, offered "warm greetings" to Bush and was "surely sincere" about not wanting war, the cable said.

Glaspie herself for years remained silent on the subject of her actions in Iraq. But in March 2008 she gave an interview to the Lebanese newspaper Dar Al-Hayat. In the interview, she said she has no regrets. "It is over," Glaspie said. 
Nobody wants to take the blame. I am quite happy to take the blame. Perhaps I was not able to make Saddam Hussein believe that we would do what we said we would do, but in all honesty, I don't think anybody in the world could have persuaded him.

In the interview, Glaspie recalled that her meeting with Saddam was interrupted when the Iraqi president received a phone call from Egyptian President Hosni Mubarak. Saddam told her he had assured Mubarak that he would try to settle the dispute, she said. Her cable backs up this version of events; the Iraqi transcript, prepared by Saddam's official English language translator, Sadoun al-Zubaydi, records Saddam saying that Mubarak called before he met with Glaspie.

Retrospective views
In 2002, the Washington Report on Middle East Affairs published a new account of the Glaspie-Saddam meeting by Andrew Killgore, a former U.S. ambassador to Qatar. Killgore summarized the meeting as follows:

The points referenced in the second and third paragraphs do not appear in the purported transcripts of the Glaspie-Saddam meeting that were released by Iraq, and on which most of the subsequent criticism of Glaspie is based. If there is a full transcript of the meeting in existence, or if the State Department declassifies Glaspie's cables about the meeting, a different assessment might be reached on her performance.

James Akins, the U.S. Ambassador to Saudi Arabia at the time, offered a somewhat different perspective in a 2000 interview on PBS:

Joseph C. Wilson, Glaspie's Deputy Chief of Mission in Baghdad, referred to her meeting with Saddam Hussein in a May 14, 2004 interview on Democracy Now!: an "Iraqi participant in the meeting [...] said to me very clearly that Saddam did not misunderstand, did not think he was getting a green or yellow light."

Wilson's and Akins' views on this question are in line with those of former Deputy Prime Minister Tariq Aziz, who stated in a 1996 interview with Frontline that, prior to the invasion of Kuwait, Iraq "had no illusions" about the likelihood of U.S. military intervention. Similarly, in a 2000 Frontline interview, Aziz declared, "There were no mixed signals", and further elaborated:

Kenneth Pollack of the Brookings Institution, writing in The New York Times on February 21, 2003, disagreed with the previously cited views of observers like Edward Mortimer. On Mortimer's stated belief that it was likely Saddam Hussein went ahead with the invasion because he drew as inference from his meeting with Glaspie that the US would react with nothing more than verbal condemnation, Pollack said: 

Professors John Mearsheimer and Stephen Walt write in the January/February 2003 edition of Foreign Policy that Saddam approached the U.S. to find out how it would react to an invasion into Kuwait. Along with Glaspie's comment that "'[W]e have no opinion on the Arab–Arab conflicts, like your border disagreement with Kuwait', the U.S. State Department had earlier told Saddam that Washington had 'no special defense or security commitments to Kuwait.' The United States may not have intended to give Iraq a green light, but that is effectively what it did."

Following WikiLeaks' January 2011 publication of Glaspie's July 1990 cable describing her discussion with Saddam, Juan Cole noted that Glaspie "pressed the dictator on the meaning of his troop build-up on the Kuwaiti border, letting him clearly know of American anxieties," and argued that "her infamous reference to the U.S. not getting involved in inter-Arab disputes referred to a limited issue, the exact border between Iraq and Kuwait, and could not possibly have been interpreted as permission to invade Kuwait!" Cole concluded: "Ms. Glaspie's detractors owe her an apology."

In popular culture 
Glaspie was portrayed by Jacqueline King in the limited series House of Saddam.

References

External links

Carleton Cole: Whatever happened to...US Ambassador to Iraq April Glaspie - The Christian Science Monitor May 27, 1999

1942 births
Living people
Ambassadors of the United States to Iraq
American women ambassadors
American people of the Gulf War
Canadian emigrants to the United States
People from Vancouver
People from Oakland, California
Paul H. Nitze School of Advanced International Studies alumni
Mills College alumni
United States Foreign Service personnel
20th-century American women
21st-century American women